IIcons is the sixth studio album by American hip hop group Naughty by Nature. It was released on May 7, 2002 on TVT Records. Production was handled by Naughty by Nature, Da Beatminerz, DJ Twinz and Lil' Jon. It features guest appearances from Rottin Razkals, 3LW, Carl Thomas, Chyna Whyte, Freddie Foxxx, Icarus, Lil' Jon, Method Man, Pink, Queen Latifah, Redman and Road Dawgs. The album was a success, peaking at No. 15 on the Billboard 200 and No. 5 on the Top R&B/Hip-Hop Albums, and spawned the single, "Feels Good (Don't Worry Bout a Thing)" which made it to No. 53 on the Billboard Hot 100.

IIcons is the only Naughty by Nature album where the group performed as a duo, as DJ Kay Gee left the group until May 2006.

Track listing

Charts

Weekly charts

Year-end charts

References

External links

2002 albums
TVT Records albums
Naughty by Nature albums
Albums produced by Lil Jon
Albums produced by Da Beatminerz